Dragon is a remote sensing image processing software package. This software provides capabilities for displaying, analyzing, and interpreting digital images from earth satellites and raster data files that represent spatially distributed data.  All the Dragon packages are derived from the code created by Goldin-Rudahl.

 Open Dragon is free to educational users. It was intended to be free worldwide, as well as open source (hence the name) but due to funding problems, it is currently available only in Southeast Asia.
 Dragon Academic is functionally identical to Open Dragon.
 Dragon Professional is expanded to handle full-scene data sets from sensors such as Landsat TM, SPOT, and Aster.

History
The initial version of Dragon was released in 1987 and ran on the MS-DOS
operating system. Dragon was the first commercial remote sensing software
package designed to use only the native capabilities of off-the-shelf personal
computers. At the time Dragon was developed, other PC remote sensing products
such as Erdas required expensive special purpose graphics
devices. Dragon was intended to be used for education in geography, geology,
forestry and other disciplines that use spatial information; thus it was very
important to minimize the costs of required hardware. The first version
of Dragon ran on a basic IBM-PC with two floppy disks and a
four-color or gray-level graphics display. Alternatively, it could use any of several models of Japanese PC.

The MS-DOS phase of Dragon development focused on trying to squeeze
functionality into very limited disk and memory space, and to get full-color
image display using  rapidly changing graphics
hardware with no standardized drivers. The VESA display standard was a
turning point in making full-color display functionality available in
MS-DOS. This VESA/SVGA/MS-DOS version of Dragon can still be adapted
for embedded systems use.

The move to Microsoft Windows 95/98 was painful because these
operating systems did not provide true multitasking. Unfortunately this phase
coincided with the publication of the well-known Gibson and Powers textbook
(Gibson,2000) which included a copy of the Windows 95 Dragon. With the advent
of Windows NT and successors (Windows 2000, XP, Vista, etc.), it became
possible to create a Windows version of Dragon that allowed simultaneous
display of and interaction with multiple images.

In 2004, funding became available from Thailand to create a free educational
version of the software which became known as OpenDragon. This project lasted
for three years.  The software is still available at no cost in Thailand,
Laos, Cambodia and Vietnam (although it has only been translated into Thai).

After funding for OpenDragon was discontinued, Dragon Professional was
developed to reach beyond the customary educational users. New personal
computer capabilities, which by then extended to gigabytes of memory and
hundreds of gigabytes of disk storage, all at low cost, made it possible to
store and process the very large data sets produced by twenty-first-century
high-resolution satellites.

Dragon Professional required major changes in the user interaction model,
which previously had assumed a 1-to-1 relationship between the image on the
screen and the sensor data. At the same time, image processing operations such
as selection of ground control points require access to individual data
elements (pixels) selected from the more than 30 million available in a
typical full-scene image. Thus, the appearance and behavior of Dragon
Professional are quite different from OpenDragon/Dragon Academic.

The name
Asian dragons are considered symbolic of wisdom and knowledge, unlike the
ferocious western dragons. Thus, the name Dragon/ips(r) or Dragon Image
Processing System is intended to imply wisdom in the knowledge of and
intelligent use of the world in which we live.

The Software
Because the expected user is assumed to be relatively untrained, Dragon pays
more attention to the user experience than to having a large selection of
possibly obscure processing operations. Within the user interface, which has
been translated into several languages, context-sensitive help explains every
user choice, and reasonable defaults are provided where possible. The User
Manual (English only) details all processing algorithms.

The software provides a fairly conventional set of remote sensing operations,
which are intended to be those which a student of geography arguably ought to
know.  These include:

 Single and multiband image display;
 Filtering for image enhancement;
 Band combinations such as sum and ratio;
 Principal components analysis;
 Image statistics and measurement;
 A variety of supervised and unsupervised classification algorithms;
 Registration and geometric correction;
 Heads-up digitizing to capture vector data;
 Some raster geographic information systems GIS operations such as slope, aspect, and buffer calculations;
 Import from and export to various standard image file formats such as GeoTIFF.

In order to provide interoperability with other software packages, and to permit users
to add their own custom processing operations, all important file formats are
documented and an API called the Programmer's Toolkit is available.

Problems
 Dragon Academic and Dragon Professional use a USB dongle for copy protection. While this allows the license to permit unlimited copying, it is also sometimes inconvenient. Other protection methods are being considered.
 Supervised and unsupervised classification operations in all versions of the software currently can process only four image bands at a time.
 Dragon can measure length and area on any georeferenced image. However this assumes the image uses a distance-preserving projection. If the image uses latitude-longitude, the measurements will be incorrect in high latitudes.
 The software runs only on Microsoft Windows, although three of its four components also build and run on Linux.

References

 Goldin and Rudahl: OpenDragon Programmer's Toolkit: A Framework for Learning Geoinformatics Software Development, Proceedings of the Annual Conference of the American Society for Photogrammetry and Remote Sensing, Baltimore, MD, March, 2009 
 Dragon User Manual, Goldin-Rudahl Systems, Inc., 2008
 Dragon User Manual, Chapter 1, Goldin-Rudahl Systems, Inc., 2008 
 Gibson, J and Power, C: Introductory Remote Sensing Digital Image Processing and Applications, Routledge, 2000
 Rudahl and Goldin, The Impact of New Technologies on Remote Sensing Education, Proceedings of the Asian Conference on Remote Sensing 1994. 
 Goldin, S.E. and Rudahl, K.T.: Dragon and Phoenix: Low-cost Image Processing for Developing Countries. Proceedings of the South East Asian Regional Computer Conference. Computer Association of Thailand, 1986, pp 41–42.

External links
  Home page for Dragon
  Home page for OpenDragon
  University site which uses OpenDragon extensively
  Discussion of Dragon's Portuguese version (in Portuguese)
  A study of urban heat modeling using Dragon

Remote sensing software
GIS software
https://instagram.com/the_crazy_boy_tmt
the_crazy_boy_tmt
https://instagram.com/the_crazy_boy_tmt?utm_medium=copy_link